H. Richard Greene (sometimes credited as "Richard Greene") is an American film, television, and stage actor, acting coach, and guest professor at UCLA.

Career

Television Roles 
He has appeared in TV shows such as Matlock, According to Jim, Ally McBeal, Boston Legal, Cold Case, The Mentalist, NYPD Blue, Cybill, The Wonder Years, and as Senator Robert Royce on The West Wing.

He was also on Mad Men, earning positive reviews for his role.

He played "Cary Russell", the name derived from Cary Grant and Jane Russell but the character itself a parody of Bruce Willis's character David Addison in Moonlighting, in the penultimate and controversial episode of Riptide called "If You Can't Beat Em, Join Em" shortly before its cancellation, in part due to being beaten in the ratings by Moonlighting. This episode drew a lot of press attention at the time, with both Entertainment Tonight and the Los Angeles Times running features on the episode. Interestingly enough, he would later appear in the actual Moonlighting as a different character.

Film Roles 
He has appeared in several TV movies, including Journey of the Heart (1997), and a few feature films, including a small role in the summer blockbuster Armageddon (1998).

Stage Roles 
In his New York debut, he received critical acclaim as MacDuff in Macbeth with Rip Torn and Geraldine Page. His Broadway credits include The Survivor, Romeo and Juliet, and the international tour of Neil Simon's Brighton Beach Memoirs, directed by Gene Saks.  He was a resident member of the Repertory Theatre of Lincoln Center, and portrayed The Headmaster in The Ahmanson's production of The History Boys on the West Coast.

Voice Roles 
His voice work includes narrating an episode of the children's TV programme, Rugrats.

Greene provided the English voice of Hot Coldman in Metal Gear Solid: Peace Walker and the voice of James Johnson in Metal Gear Solid 2: Digital Graphic Novel.

Teaching 
He is a Guest Professor at UCLA's School of Theatre, Film and Television.

Personal life 
He married actress Lynn Milgrim in 1980. The two had recurring roles as Jim and Evelyn Cooper, Winnie Cooper's parents, on The Wonder Years.

References

External links

 
 H. Richard Greene (as Richard Greene) on the Internet Broadway Database

Living people
American male film actors
American male television actors
Year of birth missing (living people)
American male stage actors
American male voice actors
American acting coaches
University of California, Los Angeles faculty